Maxwell John Nixon (24 December 1931 – 14 January 2019) was an Australian rules footballer who played with Essendon in the Victorian Football League (VFL). He spent half the 1956 season with Essendon before returning to his original club, Orbost.

Notes

External links 

Essendon Football Club past player profile

1931 births
2019 deaths
Australian rules footballers from Victoria (Australia)
Essendon Football Club players